The Cajun Catahoulas were a Junior A Tier III ice hockey team, based in Carencro, Louisiana, which is located just outside Lafayette. Initially announced in May 2005 as a Junior B team, the Catahoulas were promoted to Junior A Tier III in August 2007. The team competed in the Midwest division of the Western States Hockey League (WSHL) beginning in 2005–06 season. The Catahoula name was chosen as the Catahoula Leopard Dog is the state dog of Louisiana. For the 2008–09 season the Cajun Catahoulas moved their team and operations to North Richland Hills, Texas to become the Texas Renegades.

Season-by-season records

References

External links
 Cajun Catahoulas official website

Ice hockey teams in Louisiana
Lafayette Parish, Louisiana
Sports teams in Lafayette, Louisiana
2005 establishments in Louisiana
2008 disestablishments in Louisiana
Ice hockey clubs established in 2005
Ice hockey clubs disestablished in 2008